Dihydrouracil is an intermediate in the catabolism of uracil. It is the base present in the nucleoside dihydrouridine.

See also
 Dihydrouracil dehydrogenase (NAD+)
 Dihydrouracil oxidase
 Dihydropyrimidinase

References

Nucleobases
Ureas
Pyrimidinediones